This is a list of provinces of Laos by Human Development Index as of 2021.

References 

Laos
Human Development Index
Provinces by Human Development Index